The Syrian Army, officially the Syrian Arab Army (SAA), is the land force branch of the Syrian Armed Forces. It is the dominant military service of the four uniformed services, controlling the most senior posts in the armed forces, and has the greatest manpower, approximately 80 percent of the combined services. The Syrian Army originated in local military forces formed by the French after World War I, after France obtained a mandate over the region. It officially came into being in 1945, before Syria obtained full independence the following year.

Since 1946, it has played a major role in Syria's governance, mounting six military coups: two in 1949, including the March 1949 Syrian coup d'état and the August 1949 coup by Colonel Sami al-Hinnawi, and one each in 1954, 1963, 1966, and 1970. It has fought four wars with Israel (1948, the Six-Day War in 1967, the Yom kippur war of 1973, and 1982 in Lebanon) and one with Jordan (Black September in Jordan, 1970). An armored division was also deployed to Saudi Arabia in 1990–91 during the Persian Gulf War, but saw little action. From 1976 to 2005 it was the major pillar of the Syrian occupation of Lebanon. Internally, it played a major part in suppressing the 1979–82 Islamist uprising in Syria, and since early 2011 has been heavily engaged in fighting the Syrian Civil War, the most violent and prolonged war the Syrian Army has taken part in since its establishment in the 1940s.

History 
In 1919, the French formed the Troupes spéciales du Levant as part of the Army of the Levant in the French Mandate for Syria and the Lebanon. The former with 8,000 men later grew into both the Syrian and Lebanese armies. This force was used primarily as auxiliaries in support of French troops, and senior officer posts were held by Frenchmen, although Syrians were allowed to hold commissions below the rank of major.

1946–1970 
As Syria gained independence in 1946, its leaders envisioned a division-sized army. On June 19, 1947, the Syrian Army took the survivors of Pan Am Flight 121 to the Presbyterian mission hospital at Deir ez-Zor. The 1st Brigade was ready by the time of the Syrian war against Israel on May 15, 1948. It consisted of two infantry battalions and one armored battalion. The 2nd Brigade was organized during the 1948 Arab–Israeli War and also included two infantry battalions and one armored battalion.

At the time of the 1948 Arab–Israeli War, the army was small, poorly armed, and poorly trained. "Paris had relied primarily on French regulars to keep the peace in Syria and had neglected indigenous forces. Consequently, training was lackadaisical, discipline lax, and staff work almost unheard of. ... there were about 12,000 men in the Syrian army. These troops were mostly grouped into three infantry brigades and an armored force of about battalion size," writes Pollack.

Between 1949 and 1966, a series of military coups destroyed the stability of the government and any remaining professionalism within the army. In March 1949, the chief of staff, General Husni al-Za'im, installed himself as president. Two more military dictators followed by December 1949. General Adib Shishakli then held power until deposed in the 1954 Syrian coup d'etat. Further coups followed, each attended by a purge of the officer corps to remove supporters of the losers from the force. 'Discipline in the army broke down across the board as units and their commanders pledged their allegiance to different groups and parties. Indeed, by the late 1950s, the situation had become so bad that Syrian officers regularly disobeyed the orders of superiors who belonged to different ethnic or political groups. The 1963 Syrian coup d'état had as one of its key objectives the seizure of the Al-Kiswah military camp, home to the 70th Armored Brigade. There was another 1966 Syrian coup d'etat.

However, in 1967 the army did appear to have some strength. It had around 70,000 personnel, roughly 550 tanks and assault guns, 500 APCs, and nearly 300 artillery pieces. The army had sixteen brigades: twelve infantry, two armored (probably including the 70th Armored), and two mechanized. The Syrian government deployed twelve of the sixteen brigades to the Golan, including both armored brigades and one mechanized brigade. Three 'brigade groups', each comprising four brigades, were deployed: the 12th in the north, holding the sector from the B'nat Ya'acov bridge to the slopes of Mount Hermon, the 35th in the south from the B'nat Ya'acov bridge to the Yarmuk River border with Jordan, and the 42nd in reserve, earmarked for a theater-level counterattack role. During the Six-Day War Israeli assault of the Golan heights, the Syrian army failed to counterattack the Israelis as the Israelis breached the Syrian positions. While Syrian units fought hard whenever the Israelis entered their fields of fire, no attempts appear to have been made to exploit Israeli disorientation and confusion during the initial assault.

Judging from reports of 1967–1970, including the reporting of the 5th Infantry Division in 1970, the Army appears to have formed its first divisions during this period. The 1st and 3rd Armored Division, and 5th, 7th, and 9th Mechanized Infantry Divisions were all formed prior to 1973. Samuel M. Katz writes that after Hafez al-Assad gained power in November 1970, the army expanded to the five divisions listed above, plus ten independent brigades, an artillery rocket brigade (the 69th), and "a reinforced brigade variously termed the 70th Armored Brigade or the Assad Republican Guard. It is today known as the Armored Defense Force; as Assad's praetorian guard it is stationed in and around Damascus and subordinate to the Defense Companies under the command of Assad's brother Rifa'at."

1970–2010 
On 18 September 1970, the Syrian government became involved in Black September in Jordan when it sent a reinforced armored brigade to aid the Palestine Liberation Organization. Syrian armored units crossed the border and overran Irbid with the help of local Palestinian forces. They encountered several Jordanian Army detachments, but rebuffed them without major difficulty. Two days later, the 5th Infantry Division, heavily reinforced, was also sent into Jordan. Two armored brigades were attached to the division, bringing its tank strength up to over 300 T-55s and its manpower to over 16,000. The division entered Jordan at ar-Ramtha, destroyed a company of Jordanian Centurion tanks there, and continued directly towards Amman. Pollack says it is likely that they intended to overthrow the Jordanian monarchy itself. Despite defeating the Jordanian Army at al-Ramtha on 21 September, after fierce air attacks on 22 September, the Syrians stopped the attack and began to retreat.The retreat was caused by Jordan's appeal for international aid : "The report said that Hussein “not only appealed for the moral and diplomatic support of the United Kingdom and the United States, coupled with the threat of international action, but had also asked for an air strike by Israel against Syrian troops.”  (New York Post)

After 1970 further Syrian engagements included:
 October War against Israel
 Lebanese Civil War (1975–1990), (against Lebanese militias, the PLO and Israel)

The Syrian armed forces have also been involved in suppressing dissident movements within Syria, for example the Islamist uprising in Syria in 1979–1982. In March 1980 the 3rd Armored Division and detachments from the Defense Companies arrived in Aleppo. The division was under the command of General Shafiq Fayadh, Hafiz Assad's first cousin. The troops sealed "off whole quarters and carr[ied] out house-to-house searches, often preceded by tank fire." Hundreds of suspects were rounded up. Only two conventional Army brigades deployed to Hama in 1982, the 3rd Armored Division's 47th Armored and 21st Mechanized Brigades. Three quarters of the officers and one third of the soldiers in the two brigades were Alawites. Most of the repression was carried out by the Defense Companies and the Special Forces. Meanwhile, the Special Forces were isolating and combing through Hama, killing and capturing suspected government opponents.

Syrian forces fought Israel during the 1982 Lebanon War.

In 1984, Major General Ali Haidar's Special Forces were instrumental in blocking an abortive attempt by Rifaat Assad and his Defense Companies to seize the capital. Fayadh's 3rd Armoured Division moved into the capital to join Haidar's forces in the confrontation with the Defense Companies. The 3rd Armoured Division, it seems, had historically been based at al-Qutayfah, near Damascus.

Bennett dates the establishment of corps in the Syrian Army to 1985. Writing forty years later, Tom Cooper says "..despite the establishment of.. corps.. most division commanders continued reporting directly to the President. Correspondingly, not only the Chief of Staff of the Syrian Armed Forces but also the Corps HQ exercised only a limited operational control over the Army's divisions." Declassified CIA documents from February 1987 say that the 3rd Corps and 17th and 18th Armoured Divisions were established in 1986.

The 9th Armoured Division served in the 1991 Persian Gulf War as the Arab Joint Forces Command North reserve and saw little action.

In 1994, Haidar expressed objections to the Syrian president's decision to bring Bashar home from his studies in Britain and groom him for the succession after the death of Basil, the eldest Assad son. Soon afterwards, on 3 September 1994, Jane's Defence Weekly reported that then-President Hafez Assad had dismissed at least 16 senior military commanders. Among them was Haidar, then commander of the Special Forces, and General Shafiq Fayadh, a cousin of the President who had commanded the "crack" 3rd Armored Division for nearly two decades. The 3rd Armored Division was "deployed around Damascus." JDW commented that "the Special Forces and the 3rd Armored Division, along with the 1st Armored Division are key elements in the security structure that protects Assad's government. Any command changes involving those formations have considerable political significance." Post-uprising reporting indicated the 1st Armored Division had historically been at al-Kiswah.

On 29 September 2004, Jane's Defence Weekly reported that Syria had begun to redeploy elements of one or more Syrian Army special forces regiments based in the coastal hills a few kilometres south of Beirut in Lebanon. A senior Lebanese Army officer told JDW that the 3,000 troops involved would return to Syria.

Cordesman wrote that in 2006 the Syrian Army had "organized two corps that reported to the Land Forces General Staff and the Commander of the Land Force."

In 2009 and 2010, according to the International Institute for Strategic Studies in London, the Syrian army comprised 220,000 regular personnel, and the entire armed forces (including the navy, air force and air defenses) had 325,000 regular troops. Additionally, it had about 290,000 reservists.

In 2013, Agence France Press wrote on 'Syria's diminished security forces.'

Syrian Civil War

Defections 
At October 1, 2011, according to high-ranking defected Syrian Colonel Riad Assaad, 10,000 soldiers, including high-ranking officers, had deserted the Syrian Army.
Some of these defectors had formed the Free Syrian Army, engaging in combat with security forces and soldiers in what would turn into the Syrian Civil War.

At 16 November 2011, Rami Abdel Rahman, the head of the UK-based Syrian Observatory for Human Rights, however estimated that less than 1,000 soldiers had deserted the Syrian Army; at the same moment, an FSA battalion commander claimed that the FSA embraced 25,000 army deserters. Also in November 2011, the Free Syrian Army or the website of France 24 estimated the Syrian Army at 200,000 troops. According to General Mustafa al-Sheikh, one of the most senior defectors, however, in January 2012 the Syrian forces were estimated at 280,000 including conscripts.

By March 15, 2012, many more soldiers, unhappy with crackdowns on pro-democracy protesters, switched sides and a Turkish official said that 60,000 soldiers had deserted the Syrian army, including 20,000 since February 20. It was added that most of the deserters were junior officers and soldiers. By 5 July 2012, the Syrian Observatory for Human Rights estimated "tens of thousands" soldiers to have defected. By August 2012, 40 Brigadier generals from the Army had defected to the opposition army, out of a total of 1,200 generals.

On June 14, 2013, 73 Syrian Army officers and their families, some 202 people in total, sought refuge in Turkey. Amongst their number were seven generals and 20 colonels.

Strength impaired 
Up until July 2012, the scale of defections from the Syrian Army, though hard to quantify, was too small to make an impact on the strength of that army, according to Aram Nerguizian from the Washington-based Center for Strategic and International Studies. Strategically important units of the Syrian armed forces are always controlled by Alawite officers; defecting soldiers – by July 2012 "tens of thousands" according to the Syrian Observatory for Human Rights – are mainly Sunni without access to vital command and control, Nerguizian said, however the formed Syrian Minister of Defense General Dawoud Rajiha killed in the 18 July 2012 Damascus bombing was a Christian.
 
Analyst Joseph Holliday wrote in 2013 that "the Assad government has from the beginning of the conflict been unable to mobilize all of its forces without risking largescale defections. The single greatest liability that the Assad regime has faced in employing its forces has been the challenge of relying on units to carry out orders to brutalize the opposition." This has resulted in Bashar's following his father's precedent by attaching regular army units to more reliable forces (Special Forces, Republican Guard, or 4th Armored Division). When Hafez al-Assad directed the suppression of revolts in Hama in 1982, this technique was also used.

In 2014, analyst Charles Lister wrote that "As of April 1, 2014, the SAA had incurred at least 35,601 fatalities, which when combined with a reasonable ratio of 3 wounded personnel for every soldier killed and approximately 50,000 defections, suggests the SAA presently commands roughly 125,000 personnel. This loss of manpower is exacerbated by Syria's longentrenched problem of having to selectively deploy forces based on their perceived trustworthiness."
The International Institute for Strategic Studies in London calculated that by August 2013 the strength of the Syrian army had, compared with 2010, roughly been cut in half, due to defections, desertions and casualties: it now counted 110,000 troops.

The Syrian Arab Army suffers from serious recruitment issues as the Syrian Civil War drags on, with military age men across sectarian lines no longer willing to join or serve their conscription terms. These issues are especially notable among the Druze population, who have clashed with regime security forces and broken Druze youths out of regime imprisonment to avoid them serving in the army. Increasingly, Assad's Alawite base of support refuse to send their sons to the military due to massive casualty rates among military age men in their community; according to pro oppositions sources a third of 250,000 Alawite men of fighting age have been killed in the Syrian Civil War, leading to major tensions between the sect and the Syrian government.

As of mid-2018, then-Israeli Defence Minister Avigdor Lieberman said that the Syrian Arab Army had regained its pre-2011 strength levels, recovering from manpower shortages earlier in the Syrian Civil War.

Roles of 3rd, 11th, 17th and 18th Divisions 
The 3rd Armored Division has deployed elements of three brigades from its bases around Qutayfah to Deraa, Zabadani, and Hama, while the 11th Armored Division has stayed close to its bases in Homs and Hama.

The European Council named Major General Wajih Mahmud as commander of the 18th Armored Division in the Official Journal of the European Union on 15 November 2011, sanctioning him for violence committed in Homs. Henry Boyd of the IISS noted that "in Homs, the 18th Armored Division was reinforced by Special Forces units and ... by elements of the 4th Division under Maher's de facto command."

Information from Holliday 2013 suggests that the reserve armored division is the 17th (rather than any other designation), which was responsible for eastern Syria. The division's 93rd Brigade left Idlib to secure Raqqa Governorate in early 2012. Following the reported capture of Raqqa on 3–6 March 2013, elements of the 17th Division remained under siege to the north of the city in October 2013.

Relationship with National Defense Force 
The National Defense Force is under the control and supervision of the Syrian Army and acts in an infantry role, directly fighting against rebels on the ground and running counter-insurgency operations in co-ordination with the army which provides them logistical and artillery support.

Struggling with reliability issues and defections, officers of the SAA increasingly prefer the part-time volunteers of the NDF, who they regard as more motivated and loyal, over regular army conscripts to conduct infantry operations and act as support for advancing tanks.

An officer in Homs, who asked not to be identified, said the army was increasingly playing a logistical and directive role, while NDF fighters act as combatants on the ground.

In October 2015, the 4th Assault Army Corps (Arabic: 4 فيلق اقتحام) was established in the northeast. The NDF continues to play a significant role in military operations across Syria despite the formation of other elite units, many of which receive direct assistance from Russia.

Demographics 
Sunni Muslims make up the majority of the Syrian Arab Army and many hold high governmental positions. From the start of the Syrian Civil War till now, the Syrian Arab Army has been composed mainly of Sunni Syrians (for example, the 4th Mechanized Division is entirely composed and led by Sunnis), with mixed religious leadership at higher military positions. the Minister of Defense and also Deputy Commander-in-Chief of the Army and the Armed Forces (previously Special Forces) General Major Fahd Jassem al-Freij, and Major General Mohammad al-Shaar, an Interior Minister, are some of the Sunni Muslims in the positions of power. There also operate pro-Assad Sunni militias composed of a Baathist loyalists, such as the Ba'ath Brigades. Brigades are made up of Sunni Syrians and other Arab Sunnis from the Middle Eastern region that adhere to pan-Arab ideals. Liwa al-Quds is a pro-government, Sunni Palestinian militia that operates in Aleppo.

Structure in 2001 

Richard Bennett wrote in 2001 that "..corps [were] formed in 1985 to give the Army more flexibility and to improve combat efficiency by decentralizing the command structure, absorbing at least some of the lessons learned during the Israeli invasion of the Lebanon in 1982." The organization and military doctrine of the army followed the Soviet model.

Richard Bennett's estimate of the 2001 order of battle was:
 1st Corps HQ Damascus, which covered from Golan Heights, the fortified zone and south to Der'a near the Jordanian border.
 5th Armored Division, which included the 17th and 96th Armored Brigades and the 112th Mechanized Brigade
 6th Armored Division, with the 12th and 98th Armored Brigades and the 11th Mechanized Brigades
 7th Mechanized Division, with the 58th and 68th Armored Brigades and the 78th Mechanized Brigade
 8th Armored Division, which included the 62nd and 65th Armored Brigades and the 32nd Mechanized Brigade
 9th Armored Division, with the 43rd and 91st Armored Brigades and the 52nd Mechanized Brigade.
Bennett said the 1st Corps also [had] four independent special forces regiments, including two trained for heliborne commando operations against the Israeli signals intelligence & observation posts on Mount Hermon and elsewhere in the Golan Heights.
 2nd Corps HQ Zabadani, covers north of Damascus, to Homs and includes Lebanon.
 Bennett said in 2001 that the corps' principal units were believed to include:
 1st Armored Division, with the 44th and 46th Armored Brigades and the 42nd Mechanized Brigade
 3rd Armored Division, with the 47th and 82nd Armored Brigades and the 132nd Mechanized Brigade
 11th Armored Division, with the 60th and 67th Armored Brigades and the 87th Mechanized Brigade
 4th Mechanized Division with the 1st Armored Brigade and the 61st and 89th Mechanized Brigades
 10th Mechanized Division, headquartered in Shtoura, Lebanon. Its main units [were in 2001] deployed to control the strategic Beirut-Damascus highway with the 123rd Mechanized Brigade near Yanta, the 51st Armored Brigade near Zahle in the Beqaa Valley and the 85th Armored Brigade, deployed around the complex of positions at Dahr al-Baidar.
 three other heavy brigades from the 3rd and 11th Armored Divisions [were] known to be regularly deployed to eastern Lebanon.
 there [were] five special forces regiments in the Lebanon.
 3rd Corps HQ Aleppo,  based in the north and covered Hama, the Turkish and Iraqi borders, the Mediterranean coastline and was tasked with protecting the complex of chemical and biological warfare and missile production and launch facilities.
 The 2nd Reserve Armored Division, with the 14th and 15th Armored Brigades and the 19th Mechanized Brigade. The 2nd [was] also believed to operate as the main armored forces training formation. It seems likely that the "2nd" designation, reported in 2001, was incorrect, as it has not been reported during the Syrian Civil War.
 Other units under the control of this corps included four independent infantry brigades, one border guard brigade, one independent armored regiment, effectively a brigade group, and one special forces regiment.
 the Coastal Defense Brigade, which [operated] largely as an independent unit within the 3rd Corps area, [was] headquartered in the naval base of Latakia with four Coastal Defense Battalions in Latakia, Banias, Hamidieh and Tartous. Each Battalion has four batteries of both the short range SSC-3 Styx and long range SSC-1B Sepal missile systems.

The IISS listed smaller formations in 2006 as:
 Four independent Infantry Brigades
 Ten independent Airborne Special Forces Regiments (Seven regiments attached to 2nd Corps)
 Two independent Artillery Brigades
 Two independent Anti-tank Brigades
 Surface-to-surface Missile Command with three SSM Brigades (each with three SSM battalions),
 One brigade with FROG-7,
 One brigade with Scud-B/C/D.
 One brigade with SS-21 Scarab,
 Three coastal defense missile brigades
 One brigade with 4 SS-C-1B Sepal launchers,
 One brigade with 6 P-15 Termit launchers, alternative designation SS-C-3 'Styx'
 One brigade with 6+ P-800 Oniks launchers,
 One Border Guard Brigade

Protecting Damascus:
 4th Mechanized Division (The Defense companies were transformed into the armored division equivalent Unit 569, which in 1984 became the 4th Armored Division.)
 The Republican Guard Armored Division, with three Armored brigades, one Mechanized brigade, and one artillery regiment.

Structure in 2013 
According to Joseph Holliday, as of February 2013 the order of battle (at full strength) was:
 3 Corps (Falaq): 50,000 men in 3–4 divisions each
 14 Divisions (Firqa): 5,000–15,000 men in 5–6 brigades/regiments each
 More than 40 Brigades (Liwa): 2,500–3,500 men in 5–6 battalions (1–3 armored/mechanized + artillery/ADA/engineers) each
 Mechanized:
 105 IFVs in 3 mechanized battalions
 41 Tanks in 1 armored battalion
 3,500 soldiers
 Armored:
 105 Tanks in 3 armored battalions
 31 IFVs in 1 mechanized battalion
 2,500 soldiers
 More than 20 Regiments (Fawj): 1,500 men
 Light Infantry: 1,500 soldiers in 3 infantry battalions
 Artillery: 45 howitzers and 1,500 soldiers in 3 artillery battalions
 Battalion (Katiba): 300–500 men in 4–5 companies
 Company (Sariya): 60–80 men

Units reporting to the Chief of Staff 
  Republican Guard
 Lionesses of Defense Armored Battalion (as of 2015)
 100th Artillery Regiment  (equipped with 122 mm howitzer 2A18 (D-30) howitzers and  BM-21 "Grad" rocket launchers, is able to repel any attack by enemy forces in the city and its suburbs.)
 101st and 102nd "Security" Regiments (whose task is to provide security to the President, government ministers, senior government officials and the Army headquarters and other government institutions)
 103rd Commando Brigade
 104th Airborne Brigade (merged with the 800th Regiment)
 105th Mechanized Brigade
 800th Regiment
 30th Division - serves as an administrative command
 18th Brigade - formerly of the 10th Mechanised Division
 106th Mechanized Brigade
 123th Brigade
 124th Brigade
 47th Regiment
 147th Regiment
 Popular Security and Support Forces
  4th Armoured Division
 40th Armored Brigade
 41st Armored Brigade
 42nd Armored Brigade
 138th Mechanized Brigade
 154th Artillery Regiment
 555th Special Forces (Airborne) Regiment
 Protective Lions (Commandos), formed in May 2014.
  Special Forces Command
Note: "Special Forces" in the Syrian Arab Army denotes specialized "light" infantry (airborne, air assault) and are "elite" only in relation to the conventional mechanized, armored units of the SAA. According to a declassified CIA report the stated Special Forces regiments were created to conduct counter-insurgency operations. Special Forces units include the: 41st, 45th, 46th, 47th, 53rd and 54th independent special forces regiments. Special Forces were heavily used from the early stage of the Syrian Civil War and as a result suffered heavy casualties, possibly up to three regiments (41st, 46th, 54th) may have been destroyed during the Syrian Civil War, the surviving three regiments were merged to other formations such as the Republican Guard, Tiger Forces and 4th Corps. Later reports state that two battalions from the 54th regiment serve within the 17th Division.

 14th Special Forces Division - Appears not to be taking on any more recruits.
 36th, 554th and 556th Special Forces Regiments
 15th Special Forces Division - Some elements still surviving. Appears not to be taking on any more recruits. 
 35th and 127 Special Forces Regiments
 404th Armored Regiment

Special Forces units formed during the Syrian Civil War
 25th Special Forces Division
 Cheetah Forces Brigade
 Cheetah Forces Team 3
 Cheetah Forces Team 6
 Panther Forces Brigade
  Desert Hawks Brigade (Liwa Suqur al-Sahara). Formed in 2013, disbanded in 2017.

1st Corps 
 5th Mechanized Division
 112th, 132nd and 15th Mechanized Brigades
 12th Armored Brigade
 175th Artillery Regiment
 6th Division
 45th Regiment
 85th Brigade
 76th Armored Brigade - now defunct. Formerly part of 1st Division
 7th Mechanized Division
 68th, 121st and 88th Mechanized Brigades
 78th Armored Brigade
 (an unspecified) Artillery Regiment
  9th Armored Division
 34th and 43rd Armored Brigades
 52nd Mechanized Brigade. The 52nd Armored Brigade was reported in Der'aa in southern Syria in May 2013.
 90th Brigade
 89th Artillery Regiment

In addition the 1st Corps included the 61st and 90th independent Infantry Brigades.

2nd Corps 
 1st Armored Division
 91st and 153rd Armored Brigades
 58th Mechanized Brigade
 61st Infantry Brigade
 141st Artillery Regiment
 10th Mechanized Division
 85th and 62nd Mechanized brigades
 56th Armored Brigade - no longer active

3rd Corps 
 3rd Armored Division
 65th and 81st Armored Brigade
 21st Mechanized Brigade
 (an unspecified) Artillery Regiment (both 67th and 123rd Artillery Regiments listed with the division in 2011 by Cooper 2015.)
 8th Armoured Division
 33rd Armored Brigade - transferred from 9th Division
 45th Brigade - newly formed
 47th Armored Brigade - transferred from 3rd Division
 11th Armored Division – involved in Abu al-Duhur and second siege of Wadi Deif
 60th, 67th Armored Brigades
 87th Mechanized Brigade
 (an unspecified) Artillery Regiment (89th Artillery Regt listed with the division by Cooper 2015.)
On February 24, 2016, abna24.com reported that "Last Spring, the Syrian Arab Army's 87th Brigade of 11th Tank Division began their massive retreat across the Idlib Governorate, conceding the provincial capital and the strategic cities of Ariha and Jisr Al-Shughour to Jaysh Al-Fateh (the Army of Conquest) en route to their embarrassing exit from this province in northern Syria."

Other divisions in the north and northeast included the 17th Division (HQ Dayr az-Zawyr)
and the 18th Armoured Division (HQ Aleppo), nominally independent but supervised by the 3rd Corps.

4th Corps 
Two new corps have been established since the civil war began in 2011. The "4th Corps", "4th Assault Corps", or "4th Volunteer Assault Corps", also called the Fourth Legion - Assault  is a new formation of the Syrian Army, organized with Russian help since 2015. The original plan for the 4th Corps was to reorganize the weakened regular army units as well as irregular pro-government militias, including some National Defence Forces (NDF) units, in the governorates of Latakia as well as Tartus, and on the al-Ghab Plain. These forces would be trained, organized and armed by the Russian Armed Forces, so that they could become "special" ground forces which would retake northernwestern Syria with Russian air support.

When the 4th Corps was subsequently organized in summer and fall 2015, forces of widely different origins were included: Among these were the 103rd Republican Guard Brigade which would serve as HQ for the new corps, along with troops drawn from the 3rd and 4th Divisions, as well as Ba'ath Party, NDF, and Alawite militias. The Alawite fighters were organized into 12 units which fought under the joint command of Russian, Syrian, and Iranian officers. The remained was grouped into four "volunteer brigades", while several smaller Russian units were assigned to it in a support role. Directly paid by the Republican Guard and the government, the 4th Corps was described by Carnegie Middle East Center's expert Kheder Khaddour a formation that "blends army and militia forces".

Although the 4th Corps' initial operations such as during the 2015–16 Latakia offensive and Northwestern Syria offensive (October–November 2015) were relatively successful, the inclusion of more militias into the corps remained elusive. This was probably due to the fact that Iran remained unwilling to allow Syrian units under its control to be integrated to a primarily Russian-led formation, while many militias generally resisted any attempts to reduce their autonomy by including them in the 4th Corps. As result, the 4th Corps remained mostly limited to Latakia, where it continues to be active. As its performance during the 2016 Latakia offensive was lacking, however, its overall commander Maj. Gen. Shuqi Yusuf was dismissed in July 2016. Overall, the 4th Corps did not "live up to Moscow's expectations" and its Syrian commanders "demonstrated poor performance", despite the fact that the corps had actually succeeded in reforming the included militias into a "disciplined, organized military force".

Gregory Waters wrote via Twitter in November 2017 that '..the 6th Division [was] one of two divisions created under the Russian-built 4th Corps back in 2015. The 4th Corps project largely failed & the 6th & 2nd Divisions have remained in Latakia since.'

5th Corps 

Fifth Attack Troop Corps, also called the Fifth Legion, is an all-volunteer force, part of Syrian Army involved in the Syrian Civil War fighting against the Syrian opposition, Al-Qaeda in Syria, and ISIS. The Fifth Corps of Volunteers recruits men from over age 18 from across the country "not already eligible for military service or deserters".

According to Abdullah Soleiman Ali in al-Safir paper, formation of 'Fifth Attack Troop Corps' is the apex point of cooperation among members of Russia–Syria–Iran–Iraq coalition. 5th Corps soldiers are trained, equipped and advised by Russian military personnel since their intervention in 2015. Most main battle tanks of the 5th Assault Corps are modernized Soviet tanks, including the T-62M and T-72B3.

The 5th Corps unit, The Ba'ath Legion, was formed from Ba'ath Brigades volunteers. According to the Russian International Affairs Council, the Qalamoun Shield Forces also joined the Fifth Corps, though no other sources confirmed this.

In February 2018, 20 members of the ISIS Hunters (a 5th Corps subunit) died in a US airstrike.

In March 2021, the 5th Corps unit supported by the Russians managed to control Tuenan gas plant and Al-Thawrah oilfield in Raqqa Governorate, previously held by Liwa Fatemiyoun. That month, its commander since January 2018, Major General Zaid Salah (formerly commander the Republican Guard’s 30th Division) was sanctioned by the United Kingdom, who named him as "Responsible for the violent repression of the civilian population by troops under his command, particularly during the increased violence of the Idlib/Hama offensive which began in April 2019."

Military equipment in April 2011 (including storage) 

The vast majority of Syrian military equipment was Soviet manufactured.
 ≈ 9,300 armoured fighting vehicles (including in storage):
 ≈ 4,800 main battle tanks
 ≈ 4,500 infantry fighting vehicles and armored personnel carriers
 ≈ 6,400 towed artillery pieces:
 1,900 guns/howitzers
 ≈ 1,500 anti-aircraft guns
 ≈ 850 self-propelled artillery pieces:
 ≈ 450 self-propelled howitzers
 ≈ 400 self-propelled anti-aircraft guns
 2,190+ anti-tank guided weapon launchers
 500 multiple launch rocket systems
 84 tactical ballistic missile launchers
 4,235+ surface-to-air missile launchers:
 4,000+ MANPADS
 235 self-propelled air-defense systems

Uniforms and rank insignia (1987)

Uniforms and personnel equipment 

Service uniforms for Syrian officers generally follow the British Army style, although army combat clothing follows the Soviet model. Each uniform has two coats: a long one for dress and a short jacket for informal wear. Army officer uniforms are khaki in summer, olive in winter. Certain Army (paratroops and special forces) and Air Defense Force personnel may wear camouflage uniforms. Among the camouflage are Red Lizard, and Syrian Leaf pattern; a locally-made copy of the ERDL. Officers have a variety of headgear, including a service cap, garrison cap, and beret (linen in summer and wool in winter). The color of the beret varies according to the officer's unit. The most common beret color is black, for infantry, Engineering, Signals and supporting arms personnel, followed by Green, for Armored, Mechanized and Artillery personnel, Red for the Republican Guard and Military Police, and Maroon for the Special Forces.

In 2011, the standard issue combat helmets were the olive Chinese QGF-02, and the Soviet SSh-68 for the reserve forces. Both of them can be equipped with the "Syrian Leaf" camouflage helmet covers. The Republican Guard and Special Forces were the only units equipped with TAT-BA-7 bullet-proof vests.

Ranks 

Commissioned officers' rank insignia are identical for the army and air force. These are gold on a bright green or black shoulder board for the army and gold on a bright blue board for the air force. Officer ranks are standard, although the highest is the equivalent of Colonel General, a rank held in 1986 only by the commander in chief and the minister of defense. Navy officer rank insignia are gold stripes worn on the lower sleeve. The highest-ranking officer in Syria's navy is the equivalent of lieutenant general. Army and air force rank for warrant officers is indicated by gold stars on an olive green shield worn on the upper left arm. Lower noncommissioned ranks are indicated by upright and inverted chevrons worn on the upper left arm.

Awards 
Although some twenty-five orders and medals are authorized, generally only senior officers and warrant officers wear medal ribbons. The following are some important Syrian awards: Order of Umayyad, Medal of Military Honor, the War Medal, Medal for Courage, Yarmuk Medal, Wounded in Action Medal, and Medal of March 8, 1963.

Chief of the General Staff of the Army
The Chief of the General Staff of the Army and Armed Forces is the professional head of the Syrian Armed Forces and the Syrian Army. The Chief of the General Staff is appointed by the President of Syria, who is the commander-in-chief of the Armed Forces. As of 2019, the Chief of the General Staff has been Salim Harba, who was appointed to the role by Syrian President Bashar Al-Assad.

Notes

References 
 Richard M. Bennett, The Syrian Military: A Primer, Middle East Intelligence Bulletin, August/September 2001.

 Joseph Holliday, 'The Assad Regime: From Counterinsurgency to Civil War,' Institute for the Study of War, March 2013. The best concise description and analysis of the Syrian Army and its involvement in the current Syrian Civil War until Cooper 2015.
 
  Reviewed in Brooks, Risa A. "Making Military Might: Why Do States Fail and Succeed? A Review Essay." International Security 28, no. 2 (Fall 2003): 149-191.

Further reading 
 Department of the Army, Area Handbook for Syria, Washington, For sale by the Superintendent of Documents, U.S. Govt. Print. Off., 1965, "Department of the Army pamphlet no. 550-47." Revision of the 1958 edition.
 Pesach Melovany, Out of the North an Evil shall break forth, Tel-Aviv: Contento de Semrik, 2014.
 Hicham Bou Nassif, 'Second Class: the Grievances of Sunni Officers in the Syrian Armed Forces'
 History of the Syrian Arab Army: Prussianization of the Arab Army, the Arab Revolt of 1916–1918, and the cult of nationalization of Arabs in the Levant after World War I, Infantry Magazine, Nov-Dec 2005.
 General Mustafa Tlas (ed.), History of the Syrian Arab Army/Al-Tareekh Al-Jaish Al-Arabi Al-Soori, Volume 1: 1901–1948, Center for Military Studies. Damascus, 2000. Volume 1 is 568 pages long and covers the Arab Revolt, the short-lived monarchy under King Feisal bin Hussein, the French Mandate, the 1948 Arab-Israeli War and finally Syrian independence in 1949.

External links 

 Video: ISIS secret sniper precisely targeted with Syrian Army's missile
 Gregory Waters The Lion and The Eagle: The Syrian Arab Army's Destruction and Rebirth, July 18, 2019

 
Syria